SimilarWeb Ltd. is an Israeli web analytics company specializing in web traffic and performance. Headquartered in Tel Aviv, the company has 12 offices worldwide. Similarweb went public on the New York Stock Exchange in May 2021.

History 
The company was founded in 2007 by Or Offer in Tel Aviv, Israel. By 2009, Similarweb won the first Israeli SeedCamp, attracting the attention of international media and investors. The company raised its Series A round of $1.1 million with the investment being led by Yossi Vardi, and Docor International Management. SimilarSites, a browser extension to help users find sites similar to those they are visiting, was launched later that year.

On September 24, 2013, the company closed a Series B round led by David Alliance, Moshe Lichtman with the participation of existing investor Docor International Management.

On February 24, 2014, South Africa media giant Naspers invested $18 million into Similarweb and leading their Series C round. Within a month, Similarweb used a part of the capital for the acquisition of Israeli early-stage company TapDog for a few million dollars in shares and cash, less than a year after TapDog was founded.

In November 2014, Similarweb raised $15 million in a Series D investment.

In July 2015, Similarweb acquired personalized content discovery platform developer Swayy.

In July 2017, the company announced a $47 million round of financing led by Viola Group, Saban Ventures with participation from CE Ventures and existing investors.

In May 2021, Similarweb made its public debut on the NYSE at a $1.6B valuation.

In October 2021, Similarweb won "Best Alternative data Provider" at Hedgeweek Americas Awards 2021, for their investors intelligence suite.

On February 16, 2022, Similarweb reported earnings for Q4 2021, Q4 revenue of $40.2m and Q4 ARR of $165m.

Technology 
Similarweb develops tools that enable the analysis of the traffic and behavior of users on websites and apps. The service and datasets are provided in a limited free edition, but the paid platform is addressed to SMBs and large companies which require access to accurate comprehensive data at larger scales for marketing, sales and Market research. The data is collected from a number of different sources that provide information about the internet usage of users, including various information partners, and anonymous data from users of the various dedicated browser addons that the company distributes.

Ranking 
Similarweb ranks websites and apps based on traffic and engagement metrics. Its ranking is calculated according to the collected datasets and updated on a monthly basis with new data. The ranking system covers 210 categories of websites and apps in 190 countries and was designed to be an estimate of a website's popularity & growth potential. The company ranks websites based on traffic and engagement data, and ranks apps in the App Store (iOS/iPadOS) and Google Play Store based on installs & active user data. Analytics from SimilarWeb are comparable (albeit usually lower) than from Google Analytics.

Acquisitions 
On December 10, 2015, Similarweb announced it had acquired Quettra, a Silicon Valley-based mobile intelligence startup, to boost its mobile operations.

In November 2021, Similarweb acquired "Embee" to extend its mobile user data sets. 

In May 2022, Similarweb acquired "RankRanger" to extend its offering to the SEO industry. Rank Ranger provides keyword rank tracking services and advanced API's that will be added to Similarweb's existing SEO tools to create a more comprehensive suite.

See also 

 
 List of most visited websites
 List of search engines
 List of web directories

References

External links 

 

Analytics companies
Companies listed on the New York Stock Exchange
Web analytics
Websites
Lists of websites
Mobile applications
Lists of mobile apps
Digital marketing companies of Israel
Technology companies established in 2009